One Percent for the Planet is an international organization whose members contribute at least one percent of their annual revenue to environmental causes to protect the environment. The aim is to offer accountability, prevent greenwashing and "certify reputable giving". Their mission is to "build, support and activate an alliance of businesses financially committed to creating a healthy planet." One Percent for the Planet members assist nonprofit organizations that protect land, forests, rivers, oceans and also encourage sustainable methods of energy production.

History 

One Percent for the Planet was founded by Yvon Chouinard and Craig Mathews in 2002 to "encourage more businesses to donate 1% of sales to environmental groups".  Yvon Chouinard is the founder of the Patagonia clothing company and Craig Mathews is the founder of Blue Ribbon Flies.  The organisation now claims over 1200 members in 48 countries.

The first launch of the organization took place in San Francisco at the Patagonia store in 2002.  The second launch took place in Denver, Colorado at the “Fly Fishing Retailer show” in 2003.  In 2004, Brushfire Records and The Moonshine Conspiracy joined as the 50th members of the organisation.

Let My People Go Surfing was a book authored by Yvon Chouinard in 2005, and discusses the journey of One Percent for the Planet. According to the organisation, 2005 ended with more than 200 company memberships within the organisation.

Making A Difference series hosted by NBC Nightly News showcased One Percent for the Planet in 2006 and resulted in an additional 50 members, according to the organisation.  The organisation reached 1000 members in 2009.

In 2010, a digital music album titled 1% for the Planet, The Music, Vol. 1 was released, featuring 40 artists.  The album was number one on Amazon's MP3 chart and top-40 overall albums on iTunes.

A media partner program was created in 2011 consisting of activists,athletes and artists as ambassadors for the organisation.

In 2012, One Percent for Profit global network claims to have contributed more than $100 million protecting the environment.  This year, the organisation created the “High Impact Partnerships” program which aims to enable companies and non-governmental organisations “to identify issues where they share concern and collaborate to do more together than they can alone.”

On April 22, 2020, Yvon Chouinard published an open letter for Earth Day in which he thanked 1% for the planet community for their commitment despite the COVID-19 pandemic and its financial effects on the companies.

On April 24, 2020, 1% for the planets announced the People for the Planet awards.

In 2022, the organization celebrated its 20th anniversary.

From March 15-17, 2022, One Percent for the Planet held the Global Summit in Los Angeles, California.

Contributions 

1% of the sales of the member companies are directed to “sustainability-oriented nonprofits” that they choose to support, with an emphasis on grassroots environmental groups.  One Percent for the Planet evaluates the “track record, credibility and impact”  of the nonprofit organisation and also verifies the contributions made by the member companies. The following “Issue Categories” are supported by the member companies: alternative transportation, climate change, energy and resource extraction, environmental education, environmental law and justice, environment and human health, food, land, pollution, water and wildlife. At the moment, approved recipient partners are for example the South West Coast Path Association and New York-based the Hunger Project.

Affiliates 

One Percent for the Planet offers both corporate memberships and individual memberships.

Corporate Memberships 
There are different ways for businesses to become involved: If the whole company joins, 1% of its annual sales will be donated. One Percent for the Planet calls this "the gold standard for corporate environmental philanthropy". Examples of brands that joined this membership category include Patagonia, the Surfer's Journal, Wikiloc and Australian-based company Sunglass Fix. If a business consists of multiple brands with different names and branding, one brand or multiple brands of that business can join. In this case, 1% of the brand sales will be donated. An example is EnviroKidz as part of the A Nature's Path brand. If a business wants to start small, they can join with just one sustainable product or a product line. In this last case, 1% of the product line sales will be donated. Examples range from BIC who joined as a member in 2022 with an eco-friendly product line or Honest Tea with a glass product line. The Canadian Fair Trade Network joined One Percent for the Planet in 2014.

Individual Memberships 
Individuals that decide to join can choose to donate 1% of their salary by either donating money directly, supporting volunteers, or combining both.

References

External links 
1% for the Planet

International environmental organizations